The Incredible Crash Dummies is a 1993 computer-animated television special. It was produced in 1993. In the United States, it originally aired on Fox Kids. It was later repacked as a video to be sold with two of the Crash Dummy action figures (Ted and a "purple/gold" repainted Junkman) as well as a mail-in offer to order. Like the TV ad the series was based on the "You Could Learn a Lot from a Dummy" PSAs, episodes would have the characters announcing at the end "Don't you be a dummy, buckle your safety belts...and leave the crashing to us!" It was the first full-length television cartoon created using computer graphics.

Plot

Dummyland is a fictional world inhabited only by living crash dummies. Many make a living testing cars, just like the real ones.

The story begins with crash dummy professor Dr. Zub has creating a new "uncrashable" prototype armor called the Torso 9000 and is testing it with the help of crash dummy Ted. Unfortunately the initial trial run goes awry and Ted's head is severed from his body. The following night however, Ted is accidentally replaced with the head of the evil Junkman, who can now harness the power of the Torso 9000 and manages to break free from the Crash Test facility.

Plotting to destroy the crash dummies, the Junkman sets up his base near an abandoned scrap heap and creates an army of killing machines out of spare car parts. When a valuable disc of information on the Torso 9000 is stolen, and finally Dr. Zub himself is kidnapped, heroes Slick & Spin step in to save the day.

Cast
James Rankin as Slick/Jackhammer (voice)
Michael Caruana as Spin (voice)
John Stocker as Dr. Zub/Horst (voice)
Dan Hennessey as Junkman (voice)
Lee MacDougall as Ted (voice)
Richard Binsley as Spare Tire/Pistonhead (voice)
Paul Haddad as Bull/Daryl (voice)
Susan Roman as Computer Voice

Production

Computer Hardware & Software 
Silicon Graphics workstations were used in production utilizing Wavefront Technologie's modeling and animation software

References

External links

 

1990s children's animated films
1993 television specials
1990s animated television specials
1993 in American television
Fox Kids
Television shows written by Savage Steve Holland
Works based on advertisements